Plecturocebus is one of three genera of titi monkeys.

Historically, these monkeys were monogeneric, being placed in a single genus: Callicebus Thomas, 1903. Owing to the great diversity found across titi monkey species, a new genus-level taxonomy was proposed in 2016 that recognises three genera within the subfamily Callicebinae; Plecturocebus Byrne et al., 2016 for the Amazonian and Chaco titis of the moloch and donacophilus groups; Cheracebus Byrne et al., 2016 for the species of the torquatus group (Widow titis); and Callicebus Thomas, 1903 sensu stricto, for species of the Atlantic Forest personatus group.

Plecturocebus is derived from the Latin forms of three Greek words: plektos, meaning twist or plait, oura, meaning tail, and kebos, meaning long-tailed monkey. All together, this refers to the behavior of many titi monkeys to intertwine their tails when they sit next to each other.

Species
There are 25 species in this genus:
P. donacophilus group
 White-eared titi monkey, Plecturocebus donacophilus
 Rio Beni titi monkey, Plecturocebus modestus
 Rio Mayo titi monkey, Plecturocebus oenanthe
 Olalla brothers' titi monkey, Plecturocebus olallae
 White-coated titi monkey, Plecturocebus pallescens
 Urubamba brown titi monkey, Plecturocebus urubambensis
 P. moloch group
 Madidi titi monkey, Plecturocebus aureipalatii
 Baptista Lake titi monkey, Plecturocebus baptista
 Prince Bernhard's titi monkey, Plecturocebus bernhardi
 Brown titi monkey, Plecturocebus brunneus
 Chestnut-bellied titi monkey, Plecturocebus caligatus
 Caquetá titi monkey, Plecturocebus caquetensis
 Ashy black titi monkey, Plecturocebus cinerascens
 Coppery titi monkey, Plecturocebus cupreus
 White-tailed titi monkey, Plecturocebus discolor
 Hershkovitz's titi monkey, Plecturocebus dubius
Alta Floresta titi monkey, Plecturocebus grovesi
 Hoffmanns's titi monkey, Plecturocebus hoffmannsi
 Milton's titi monkey, Plecturocebus miltoni
 Red-bellied titi monkey, Plecturocebus moloch
 Ornate titi monkey, Plecturocebus ornatus
 Parecis titi monkey, Plecturocebus parecis
 Stephen Nash's titi monkey, Plecturocebus stephennashi
 Toppin's titi monkey, Plecturocebus toppini
 Vieira's titi monkey, Plecturocebus vieirai

References

 
Primate genera
Taxa described in 2016